Kenny Burns (born October 29, 1972 in Washington, DC) is an entertainment industry executive, television and radio host as well as an Entrepreneur. Burns serves as the Senior Vice President of Brand Development for Combs Enterprises, the entrepreneurial arm for entertainment mogul, Sean Combs, which houses brands such as Ciroc Vodka, Sean John, Bad Boy, REVOLT TV, Combs Wine and Spirits, AQUA Hydrate, DeLeón Tequila and Enyce.

Career 
In 2004, Burns partnered with Derek Dudley and Ryan Glover to launch a men's clothing line called Ryan Kenny, which landed them in Black Enterprise's February 2005 issue for the 75 Most Powerful Blacks in Corporate America. In 2005, Burns founded a boutique record label and a Studio 43, signing Wale as his first artiste.

Early life 
Burns attended Woodrow Wilson High School in Washington, D.C. and went on to attend Morris Brown College. At Morris Brown, he launched a promotions company, 2620 Entertainment, which introduced acts like Outkast, Jay Z and Notorious B.I.G. to the Atlanta Markets.

References 

African-American businesspeople
African-American fashion designers
American fashion designers
African-American radio personalities
African-American television talk show hosts
American music industry executives
American television talk show hosts
Living people
Radio personalities from Atlanta
Radio personalities from New York City
Radio personalities from Washington, D.C.
1972 births
21st-century African-American people
20th-century African-American people